The 2013 Motegi GT 250km was the final showdown of the 2013 Super GT season, the 8th points scoring race for GT500 cars and the 9th for GT300 cars. It took place on November 3, 2013 at Twin Ring Motegi in Motegi, Tochigi, Japan.

Background
Kohei Hirate and Yuji Tachikawa led the championship for Team Cerumo, having scored 58 points. Following their win at the previous race, TOM'S drivers Kazuki Nakajima and James Rossiter were 2nd in the championship, four points behind Cerumo. Eight teams in GT500 had a theoretical chance at winning the championship entering the Motegi round. In GT300 Team Mugen had an eight-point lead over Goodsmile Racing's Tatsuya Kataoka and Nobuteru Taniguchi, while in GT300 only five teams had a possibility of winning the championship. The Balance of Performance was re-adjusted in GT300, the air restrictor sizes for the Honda CR-Z and Subaru BRZ were returned to their sizes that were at the Fuji 300km round. 

Because Motegi was the final round of the championship, teams that competed in all rounds of the championship had their weight ballast removed, all cars with the exception of the #5 Team Mach Nissan GT-R GT3 ran without weight ballast. Unlike other rounds which are normally 300km in length, Motegi is only a 250km race. 38 cars entered the final round at Motegi, the #360 Tomei Sports Nissan GT-R GT3 not entering Motegi was the only change from the Autopolis entry list.

Report

Practice
The #38 Team Cerumo Lexus SC430 was fastest GT500 car in practice while the #100 Team Kunimitsu Honda HSV-010 GT was second fastest. In GT300 The #11 Gainer Mercedes-Benz SLS AMG GT3 set the fastest time from the #16 Team Mugen Honda CR-Z. The #37 TOM'S SC430 caused the first red flag 17 minutes into the session after spinning off at the final turn. A second red flag came out 40 minutes in after the car that was fastest at the end of the session, #38 Team Cerumo SC430 spun off at turn 2. The #19 Bandoh SC430 also had a problem and stopped on circuit with 20 minutes remaining.

Qualifying
Qualifying was held on November 2, 2013. In the first session for all GT300 cars the championship leader, the Team Mugen Honda CR-Z with Yuhki Nakayama was fastest from the #11 Gainer SLS. The session was red flagged as Takashi Kobayashi spun off at the hairpin and was unable to rejoin the circuit, and would have to start the race from the rear of the grid. The only championship-contending team eliminated in Q1 for GT300 was the #52 SLS with Hironori Takeuchi driving. In the first GT500 session Masataka Yanagida was fastest for NISMO, 2nd went to Takashi Kogure. Both Frédéric Makowiecki and James Rossiter, driving for teams that entered Motegi 3rd and 4th in the championship respectively failed to make the cutoff for the second session.

In the second GT300 session Kota Sasaki was fastest in the #61 Subaru BRZ, scoring the team's 5th pole position of the season and Sasaki's 10th in his career. Three of the 4 championship contending teams started in the top three, the GSR Hatsune Miku BMW that was 2nd in the championship would start 7th. Kazuya Oshima was fastest in the second GT500 qualifying session, setting a time a tenth faster than Koudai Tsukakoshi. The championship leading team would start 4th.

Race
The race was held on November 3, 2013. Oshima started the #6 SC430 from pole position and kept his lead while Tetsuya Yamano was able to lead from the start in GT300, but on lap 4, Björn Wirdheim had overtaken Yamano for the lead, Wirdheim in the #11 Gainer SLS being able to lap much faster than anyone else in the class. On lap 4 in GT500 Kohei Hirate in the #38 SC430 passed Toshihiro Kaneishi in the #17 HSV-010 for 2nd and was then under attack from multiple cars behind. Oshima and Wirdheim kept extending their leads in their respective classes throughout the first stint, Oshima building nearly 20 seconds over Hirate and Wirdheim had nearly 40 seconds on 2nd.

The first pitstops occurred as early as lap 19, Kaneishi in the #17 being the first of the lead group to pit with Tsugio Matsuda, Juichi Wakisaka and Naoki Yamamoto pitting as well. Cerumo pitted a lap after and Yuji Tachikawa managed to keep his position over the #17, now with Koudai Tsukakoshi driving. On lap 32 Hiroaki Ishiura passed Tsukakoshi for 3rd, but 3 laps later Tsukakoshi re-passed Ishiura and began closing on Tachikawa again. Andre Couto and Ralph Firman made contact on lap 38, sending Firman into the wall and Couto receiving a drive-through penalty for the incident. Tsukakoshi overtook Tachikawa for 2nd on lap 38 but Tachikawa still held a 2-point lead in the championship and with other Lexus SC430's behind there was no change in position for the rest of the race, giving Team Cerumo, Tachikawa and Hirate the championship. Yuji Kunimoto won his first GT500 race for Team LeMans and Oshima won his 3rd GT500 race.

Kota Sasaki was catching Yuhki Nakayama for 2nd in GT300 in the closing laps but with two laps to go Sasaki spun, which assured Nakayama would finish 2nd, which was enough for Team Mugen to win the GT300 championship by five points over the race winners of Katsuyuki Hiranaka and Björn Wirdheim, who were well ahead of anyone else in their class.

Results

Qualifying

Race
Race result is as follows.

GT500 Fastest Lap – Kazuya Oshima, #6 Lexus Team LeMans ENEOS Lexus SC430 – 1:44.056
GT300 Fastest Lap – Kota Sasaki, #61 R&D Sport Subaru BRZ – 1:50.728

Point rankings after the event

GT500 Driver Point rankings

GT300 Driver Point rankings

 Note: Only the top five positions are included for both GT500 and GT300 classes.

References

External links
Super GT official website 

Motegi GT 250km